Wade Allen (born April 12, 1972) is an American assistant director and stuntman. He was nominated for an Primetime Emmy Award in the category Outstanding Stunt Coordination for his stunt coordination in Barry in 2019. In 2022, Allen won an Primetime Emmy Award for his stunt coordination for Barry at the 74th Primetime Creative Arts Emmy Awards.

References

External links 

1972 births
Living people
Place of birth missing (living people)
Assistant directors
American stunt performers
Primetime Emmy Award winners